Savanes may refer to:

Savanes Region, Togo
Savanes Region (Ivory Coast), the defunct region
Savanes District, Ivory Coast, the current district